Gemma or GEMMA may refer to:

People and fictional characters
 Gemma (given name), includes a list of people and fictional characters with the name
 Gemma (surname), includes a list of people with the name

Science and technology

Biology
 Gemma (botany), an asexual reproductive structure in plants and fungi
 A monotypic genus of the Veneridae family of saltwater clams
 Gemma gemma, the type species
 A bud-like appendage in ants of the Diacamma genus

Other uses in science and technology
 Walter Gemma, a radial aero engine manufactured by Walter Aircraft Engines in the early 1930
 Gas phase electrophoretic molecular mobility analysis (GEMMA), a chemical analysis technique
 Gemma, the traditional name for the binary star Alpha Coronae Borealis
 Gemma, an Arduino-compatible microcontroller designed by Limor Fried

Ships
 Italian submarine Gemma
 , a Dutch coastal tanker lost in 1951
 , a German cargo ship in service during 1928

Other uses
 Gemma (organisation), an English organization for disabled lesbians

See also 
 Jemma (disambiguation)